Mark Harris is an American contemporary Christian music (CCM) singer and songwriter.

Career

Harris began his music career in the contemporary Christian music group Truth after graduating from Lee University in Cleveland, Tennessee.

4Him (1989–2006)
Harris is a founding member of the CCM male quartet, 4Him, which toured and recorded from 1990 to 2006. He wrote or co-wrote 25 number-one songs. 4Him won eight GMA Dove Awards, and were nominated for a Grammy Award for their album The Message.

Solo (2006–present)
Harris began a solo career in 2005 and released his debut solo album, The Line Between the Two. He followed Windows and Walls. He won a GMA Dove Award in the category of Inspirational Song of the Year for his single "Find Your Wings". In 2009, he released a Christmas album titled, Christmas Is. In 2011, he released his fourth solo project, Stronger in the Broken Places. As a solo artist he has had three number-one songs.

He also released a book with Howard Publishing/Simon and Schuster in 2009, that bears the same title as his hit, "Find Your Wings".

Harris joined the staff at Gateway Church in Southlake, Texas, in March 2013, and serves as executive pastor of worship ministries.

Discography

As member of 4Him 

 1990: 4Him
 1991: Face the Nation
 1992: The Basics of Life
 1993: The Season of Love (Christmas)
 1994: The Ride
 1996: The Message
 1998: Obvious
 2000: Hymns: A Place of Worship
 2001: Walk On
 2003: Visible

Solo

Singles 

 "Find Your Wings" (from The Line Between the Two) No. 1 on R&R Adult Contemporary charts

Other album appearances 

 2004: Creation: The Story of Life (various artists), "The Story of Light"
 2007: Glory Revealed: The Word of God in Worship (various artists), "By His Wounds" (with Steven Curtis Chapman, Mark Hall, Brian Litrell, Mac Powell)
 2011: Consuming Worship (various artists), "Ashes To Fire"
 2011: Courageous: Motion Picture Soundtrack (various artists), "When We're Together"

With Gateway Worship 

 2014: It Is Written: Songs from Gateway Devotions
 2015: The Blessed Life: Songs from Gateway Devotions
 2015: WALLS
 2017: Monuments

Tours
 Freedom Blast Tour (2000, 2001)

References

External links
 
 

American male singers
American performers of Christian music
Fair Trade Services artists
Living people
Songwriters from Alabama
1962 births
American male songwriters